Rivers of Estonia are short and mostly have small discharge. Only 10 rivers are longer than 100 km. The largest river is Narva (length 77 km) on the Estonian–Russian border, whose average discharge is larger than that of all other rivers combined.

Longest rivers

List of rivers
List is incomplete.

References
Estonica: The hydrographic network

 
Estonia
Rivers